Sharon Center may refer to the following places in the United States:

 Sharon Center, Iowa
 Sharon Center, Ohio